Baron Milner may refer to:

Baron Milner of Leeds, a barony in the peerage of the United Kingdom
A subsidiary title of Alfred Milner, 1st Viscount Milner (1854–1925)

Extinct baronies in the Peerage of the United Kingdom
Noble titles created in 1901